Democrats for Life of America (DFLA) is a 501(c)(4) American political advocacy nonprofit organization that seeks to elect anti-abortion Democrats and to encourage the Democratic Party to oppose euthanasia, capital punishment, and abortion. DFLA's position on abortion is in opposition to the current platform of the Democratic Party, which generally supports abortion rights.

The group takes no position on most socioeconomic issues or any foreign policy. They have drafted the Pregnant Women Support Act, a comprehensive package of federal legislation and policy proposals that supporters hope will reduce the number of abortions. They have an affiliated political action committee, DFLA PAC.

They have proposed linking a ban on abortions after 20 weeks of gestation to increased support for pregnant women and mothers, such as paid medical leave and/or more support for affordable day care.

History
In 1999, Democrats for Life of America was founded to coordinate, at a national level, the efforts of anti-abortion Democrats.

In the 1960s and 1970s, anti-abortion Democrats comprised a substantial portion of the party's membership in the United States Congress and the United States Senate. Some Democratic presidential and vice-presidential candidates ran for those offices as anti-abortion, including Hubert Humphrey and Sargent Shriver. Others were once anti-abortion before running, such as Ted Kennedy, Jesse Jackson, Bill Clinton, and Al Gore. In the 1980s, the influence of anti-abortion advocates in the Democratic Party declined slowly but considerably.

At the 1992 Democratic National Convention, anti-abortion Governor Robert Casey of Pennsylvania was allegedly "barred from addressing the Convention because of his antiabortion views". The official reason given by the Convention organizers was that Casey was not allowed to speak because he did not support the Democratic ticket. Kathy Taylor, a pro-abortion rights activist from Pennsylvania, instead addressed the convention. Taylor was a Republican who had worked for Casey's opponent in the previous gubernatorial election. Several anti-abortion Democrats did address the delegates in 1992, though they did not address the anti-abortion stance, and were not given prominent prime time slots. Governor Casey's son Bob Casey Jr., also an anti-abortion Democrat, spoke during the 2008 Democratic National Convention.

Anti-abortion Democrats in recent elections

2004
In their 2005 book, Take It Back: Our Party, Our Country, Our Future, Paul Begala and James Carville praised Democrats for Life for their work that led to the Pregnant Women Support Act. In the book they say the legislation "is built around seventeen concrete policy proposals that would reduce the number of abortions.... We believe these proposals would do more to prevent abortions than all the speeches, all the marches and all the campaign ads the pro-lifers have used over the past 30 years." They go on to call it "both good politics and, we think, good policy". The initiative has become legislation known as the Pregnant Women Support Act, which "has gained broad support and even has attracted some Republican backers". The Commonwealth of Virginia is the first state to pass a version of the PWSA.

Organizations and Individuals who support the bill include the National Association of Evangelicals, Sojourners/Call to Renewal, U.S. Conference of Catholic Bishops, Americans United for Life, National Council on Adoption, Life Education and Resource Network, Redeem the Vote, Care Net, Tony Campolo (founder of the Evangelical Association for the Promotion of Education), Joe Turnham (Chairman, Alabama Democratic Party), U.S. Senator Bob Casey Jr., and actor Martin Sheen.

2010
The organization has endorsed Congresswoman Kathy Dahlkemper and Congressmen Jim Oberstar, Joe Donnelly, Steve Driehaus, and many other anti-abortion Democrats for the 2010 midterm elections, and its PAC raised over $42,000 in 2010. Of the four mentioned above, only Donnelly was reelected. Oberstar was defeated after 18 terms. Additionally, all four of the freshmen endorsed by DFLA in 2008 were defeated for re-election in 2010 (see above).

2018 
Representative Dan Lipinski, a long-time anti-abortion Democrat, from one of Illinois' Chicago-area House districts won his primary. Three Democratic Senators, who self-identify as anti-abortion, had voted to ban abortion after 20 weeks and ran for reelection to the US Senate; Bob Casey of Pennsylvania, Joe Donnelly of Indiana, and Joe Manchin of West Virginia had all voted with most Republicans on the issue. Donnelly and Manchin had been endorsed by Democrats for Life in their reelection bids.

On the afternoon of July 20, 2018, DLFA Executive Director Kristen Day hosted an event where anti-abortion Democrats from around the nation gathered for their first annual conference at a Radisson Hotel in Aurora, Colorado. Over 18 individual speaking sessions were arranged over the course of three days. The keynote speaker on Friday evening was former U.S. Representative Bart Stupak (D-MI) who was instrumental in keeping abortion funding out of the Affordable Care Act in 2010. Stupak discussed the challenges of being an anti-abortion Democrat while promoting his new book For All Americans.

2020 
Representative Dan Lipinski was defeated in a primary election against Marie Newman. Representatives Collin Peterson and Ben McAdams were both defeated in their general election races. This left Henry Cuellar as the only anti-abortion Democrat in the House of Representatives.

See also
Abortion debate
American Solidarity Party
Communitarianism
Consistent ethic of life
Factions in the Democratic Party
Fetal and children's rights
Libertarians for Life
Philosophical aspects
Republican Majority for Choice
United States anti-abortion movement

References

External links

Life of America
Factions in the Democratic Party (United States)
Anti-abortion organizations in the United States
1999 establishments in the United States
501(c)(4) nonprofit organizations